Herinnering aan Holland is a poem written by Dutch poet Hendrik Marsman (1899–1940), first published in 1936. The poem describes the Dutch landscape and the Dutch struggle against the water. It is one of the best-known poems in the Dutch language.

References

External links
 Herinnering aan Holland
 Translation

Dutch poems
1936 poems